The 1986 San Diego State Aztecs football team represented San Diego State University during the 1986 NCAA Division I-A football season as a member of the Western Athletic Conference (WAC).

The team was led by head coach Denny Stolz, in his first year. They played home games at Jack Murphy Stadium in San Diego, California. They completed the regular season as Champions of the WAC, with a record of eight wins, four losses (8–4, 7–1 WAC). The year finished with their first post-season bowl game in 17 years, the Holiday Bowl against the 19th-ranked Iowa Hawkeyes.

Schedule

Team players in the NFL
The following were selected in the 1987 NFL Draft.

The following finished their college career in 1986, were not drafted, but played in the NFL.

Team awards

Notes

References

San Diego State
San Diego State Aztecs football seasons
Western Athletic Conference football champion seasons
San Diego State Aztecs football